Woods Field is a baseball park located in Marshall, TX and home to the East Texas Baptist University Tigers baseball team of the American Southwest Conference.

References

Baseball venues in East Texas
Baseball venues in Texas
East Texas Baptist Tigers baseball
Buildings and structures in Marshall, Texas